Register or registration may refer to:

Arts entertainment, and media

Music
  Register (music), the relative "height" or range of a note, melody, part, instrument, etc.
 Register, a 2017 album by Travis Miller
 Registration (organ), the art of combining the different sounds of a pipe organ to produce the desired sound

Periodicals

Australia 
 South Australian Register, later The Register, originally the South Australian Gazette and Colonial Register

United Kingdom
 Sheffield Register, England
 Socialist Register, an annual British journal
 The Register, a technology news website

United States
 Federal Register, a public journal of the United States federal government
 Napa Valley Register, Napa Valley, California
 National Catholic Register, the oldest national Catholic newspaper in the United States
 New Haven Register, Connecticut
 Orange County Register, Santa Ana, California
 Social Register, one of a number of directories of prominent American families
 The Des Moines Register, Iowa
 The New England Historical and Genealogical Register, Boston, Massachusetts

Other uses in arts, entertainment, and media
 Register (art), the separation of multiple pictographic scenes from each other
 Registration acts (comics), fictional legislation that is a focus in Marvel Comics
 The Register, a technology news website

Documents, records and government

 Accession Register, identifiers assigned to each acquisition in a library or archive
 Register, official student records kept by an academic institution's Registrar
 Check register, booklet used to record account transactions
 Civil registration, government recording of births, marriages, and deaths
 Company register, a record of organizations in the jurisdiction they operate under
 Family register, a registry used to track information of genealogical or legal interest
 Register (General Land Office), head of a district office which sold public lands under the United States' General Land Office system
 Register office (United Kingdom), where births, deaths and marriages are officially recorded
 Registration statement, a set of U.S. legal documents
 Resident registration, government recording of place of residence
 Summit register (or canister), record of visitors to a mountain's summit
 Vehicle registration, compulsory registration of a vehicle with a government authority
 Aircraft registration, registration of an aircraft with a government authority
 Vehicle registration plate, metal or plastic plate attached to registered vehicle
 Watercraft registration, registration of a watercraft with a government authority (See § Maritime for examples)
 Voter registration, entry onto an electoral roll

Linguistics
 Register (sociolinguistics), a form of a language used for a particular purpose or in a particular social setting
 Register (phonology), a sound system that combines tone with phonation
 Vocal register, the range of tones in the human voice

Maritime
 Ship registration, the process by which a ship is documented
 Watercraft registration, compulsory registration of a watercraft with a government authority

Registry organizations
 Indian Register of Shipping, an independent ship classification society, founded in India in 1975
 International Register of Shipping, an independent classification society
 Korean Register of Shipping, a not-for-profit classification society founded in South Korea
 Lloyd's Register, a global engineering, technical and business services organisation and a maritime classification society
 Norwegian International Ship Register, a Norwegian ship register for Norwegian vessels
 Norwegian Ship Register, a domestic ship register for Norway
 Polish Register of Shipping, an independent classification society established in 1936
 Russian Maritime Register of Shipping, an international classification society established in 1913

Other maritime uses
 USS Register, several United States Navy ships
 Naval Vessel Register, the official inventory of ships and service craft in custody of or titled by the United States Navy

Technology

Computing and telecommunications
 Register (C programming language), a reserved word (keyword) and type modifier
 Register (codebook), a codebook, a finite list of defined terms, used i.e. as a primary key in databases
 Hardware register, a placeholder for information about some hardware condition
 Status register, a collection of flag bits for a computer processor
 Processor register, a component inside a central processing unit for storing information
 Quantum register, the quantum mechanical analogue of a classical processor register
 Register signaling, in telecommunications
 Register.com, a domain registrar

Other technologies
 Camera register or flange focal distance, distance from the mounting flange to the film plane of an interchangeable lens camera
 Cash register, a device for recording cash transactions and storing cash
 Image registration, process of transforming different sets of data into one coordinate system
 Printing registration, in color printing, the correlating of colors in a single image
 User registration, the process of becoming a registered user

Other uses
 Register (surname), a list of people with the surname
 Register, Georgia, a town in The United States
 Register (air and heating), synonym of "grille", "return" in HVAC system

See also
 Registered (disambiguation)
 Registrar (disambiguation)
 Registry (disambiguation)